Nabeul Museum (Arabic: متحف نابل) is an archaeological museum located in Nabeul, Tunisia. It was established in 1984.

The museum was established to collect some of the objects found during excavations that took place at various sites of Cape Bon.

It features objects from ancient Nabeul (Neapolis), as well as items from other archaeological sites of Cape Bon. The Nabeul Museum contains pieces dating from before the Roman period, ceramics and amulets in the ancient Egyptian style of Kerkuane, and terracotta statues from the Punic sanctuary of Thinissut. Roman collections are illustrated by numerous mosaics found at Neapolis. In recent years, the content of the museum is enriched by the acquisition of three mosaics of Kelibia as well as the opening of a hall dedicated to the search of a factory of salting of fish.

See also
Carthage Paleo-Christian Museum
Dar Essid Museum
Dar Jellouli Museum
Douz Museum

References

Archaeological museums in Tunisia